The Canary Wharf – Rotherhithe Ferry is a passenger ferry across the River Thames in the south east of London, England. The service connects Canary Wharf Pier, serving the major Canary Wharf office development north of the river, with Nelson Dock Pier at the Doubletree Docklands Hotel in Rotherhithe.

Boats operate roughly every 10 minutes at peak time, or every 20 minutes off-peak time. There are service breaks between 11:03–12:05 and 20:13–21:05.

Boats can be used both by guests of the hotel as well as by passengers not staying at the hotel.

The service is operated by Thames Clippers, who also operate commuter boats along the river, but uses rather smaller boats.

In March 2020 the service was suspended due to the Covid-related closure of the Doubletree by Hilton hotel in Rotherhithe. The service re-opened in September 2020.

See also
 Crossings of the River Thames

References 

London River Services
River Thames ferries